These are the Billboard magazine R&B albums that reached number one in 1993.

Chart history

See also
1993 in music
R&B number-one hits of 1993 (USA)

1993